Manettia is a genus of flowering plants in the family Rubiaceae. There are between 80 and 123 species. They are distributed in the West Indies, Mexico, and Central and South America. Most are vines. The genus was named after Saverio Manetti.

Species include:
Manettia angamarcensis
Manettia arboricola
Manettia canescens
Manettia cordifolia
Manettia herthae
Manettia holwayi
Manettia lilacina
Manettia longicalycina
Manettia luteorubra
Manettia microphylla
Manettia nebulosa
Manettia nubigena
Manettia pichinchensis
Manettia skutchii
Manettia stenocalyx
Manettia teresitae

References 

 
Rubiaceae genera